A data cooperative is a group of individuals voluntarily pooling together their data. As an entity, a data cooperative is a type of data infrastructure, formed through the voluntary and collaborative pooling efforts of individuals. As a data infrastructure, data cooperatives are created, owned and operated by community members, and this enables the communities, and its members, to have full control over their data, and the decisions that are made by the insights gathered from the data. By giving individual community members control over their data, data cooperatives are a new and innovative type of data infrastructure, that act as a counter weight against data brokers and data driven corporations.

Key aspects

Ownership rights 
One key aspect of data cooperatives is that the individual members of a data cooperative have control and legal ownership over their data. As a key aspect, ownership rights also refers to the notion that all members of a data cooperative must be able to collect copies of their data. This can be done either automatically through electronic means (e.g. passive data-traffic copying software on their devices) or it can me done by manually uploading data files to the cooperative. The data that is collected is stored in a members personal data store (PSD). Within an individuals personal data store, members have the ability to add, remove or restrict access to personal data.

Fiduciary obligations to members 
This key aspect of data cooperatives refers to the legally bound obligations that cooperatives have to its members. Data cooperatives are member owned and member run, and there needs to be a set of rules (bylaws), that govern the cooperative, and have been agreed on by all members. The main factor that these rules cover are policies regarding the usage and or access of member owned data.

Direct benefit to members 
This key aspect refers the overall desired goals outcomes of a data cooperative. Data cooperatives must provide benefit to all members of the cooperative. Data cooperatives accomplish this by analyzing the data and identifying useful insights amongst the data, that is then shared to the members of the cooperative.

Counter weight to data power imbalances 

Within contemporary societies, "data" - as a commodity - is continuously becoming more valuable. Over the past decade, the control of data has been concentrated between a limited number of actors, such as; 'big tech' companies (e.g. Facebook & Google) and government entities. By forming a data cooperative, citizens can actively establish themselves as stakeholders within the world's data economy. Through creating stakeholders, data cooperatives contribute to evening out the data power imbalances by competing against, and impeding on the data monopolies that the 'big tech' companies and government entities have.

Ecosystem

Main entities 
The three main entities that make up a data cooperative are:

 Data cooperative as a legal entity.
 The individuals who make up the cooperative.
 The entities that are external to the cooperative, but still interact with it. This entity refers to the IT services providers who are giving the data cooperative it's IT infrastructure functionalities.

Examples

Ride-share automobile drivers (e.g. Uber, Lyft, etc.) 
Currently, drivers for ride-share services have no effective way to compare their respective incomes across similar routes, areas and distances. Similarly, people who use these ride-share services don't have a way to compare average fees between similar trips people take. The members of a ride-share automobile service community could form a data cooperative by pooling together data accessible to them on their devices, and use the data to see whether on average they are receiving a similar quality of service and equitable earnings across a wide geographic area.

Challenges

Cost 
One challenge that data cooperatives are faced with is the overhead cost required to establish and maintain the cooperative. As a data infrastructure, data cooperatives need a substantial financial investment in order to support and maintain the IT infrastructural capabilities necessary for a data cooperative.

Regulations and policies 
Current policies and regulations regarding privacy, data reuse and deletion, data interoperability, and portability enable a select group of stakeholders to dominate data ownership. The challenge here is that in order for these regulations and policies to change (specifically in a way that enables the lasting success of a data cooperative), the people who have the power to do so will first have to understand and agree that data cooperatives are appropriate and beneficial.

References 

Wikipedia Student Program
Data protection
Cooperatives